Alexander Speirs (died 5 October 1844) was a Scottish  politician who sat in the House of Commons from 1835 to 1841.

Speirs was the son of Archibald Speirs and his wife Margaret Dundas, daughter of Thomas Dundas, 1st Baron Dundas. 
 
In 1835 Speirs was elected Member of Parliament for Richmond. He held the seat until 1841. He was Lord-Lieutenant of Renfrewshire from 8 August 1838 until his death.

Speirs married in 1836 Eliza Stewart Hagart, daughter of Thomas C. Hagart of Bantaskine and his wife Miss Stewart "of the Field" a well-known Glasgow beauty. Their son Archibald Alexander Speirs was MP for Renfrewshire and their daughter Eliza married Colonel Alexander of Ballochmyle, M.P. for Ayrshire.

References

External links

1844 deaths
Lord-Lieutenants of Renfrewshire
Year of birth missing
Place of birth missing
Members of the Parliament of the United Kingdom for English constituencies
UK MPs 1835–1837
UK MPs 1837–1841